Ralph Stockman Tarr (January 15, 1864 – March 21, 1912) was an American geographer.

Biography
He was born at Gloucester, Massachusetts, and educated at Harvard, where he graduated from the Lawrence Scientific School in 1891, and worked as an assistant in geology from 1890 to 1891. Beginning in 1892, he served as assistant in geology at Cornell, where he became professor of dynamic geology and physical geography from 1897 until his death.

He was Assistant United States Fish Commissioner 1882-3 while he was connected with the Smithsonian Institution, and Assistant Geologist for the Texas Geological Survey in 1888 and 1891. He was in charge of the 1896 Cornell expedition to Greenland largely to study glaciology while being attached to the Peary expedition's goal to retrieve a large iron meteorite.

Writings
Besides acting as associate editor of the Bulletin of the American Geographical Society and the Journal of Geography, he published:
 Economic Geology of the United States (1893)
 Economic Geology of the United States (1898)
 Physical Geography of New York State (1902)
 New Physical Geography (1903)
 Geography of Science (1905), with C. A. McMurry

Two posthumous publications were published:  College Physiography (1914) and Alaskan Glacier Studies (1914), with Lawrence Martin.

References

External links

American geographers
People from Gloucester, Massachusetts
1864 births
1912 deaths
American science writers
Harvard School of Engineering and Applied Sciences alumni
American male journalists
Cornell University faculty
Presidents of the American Association of Geographers